Yanouh is a village and municipality in the Byblos District of the  Keserwan-Jbeil Governorate, Lebanon. It is located 94 kilometers north of Beirut. Yanouh's inhabitants are predominantly Maronite Catholics. Its average elevation is 1,120 meters above sea level and its total land area is 147 hectares. Yanouh stands on the slopes of Joubbat El Mnaitra, five miles east of Qartaba, on the right bank high up in the ravine carved out by the Adonis River, now known as Nahr Ibrahim.

Yanouh, once a Phoenician center, is half-way between Byblos and Heliopolis (Baalbek), around 20 km as the crow flies from the Mediterranean Sea. Its Phoenician temple is a monument to the same religion as that of Apheca, but the later Roman temple was dedicated to Diana, the Roman goddess of the hunt and daughter of the god Jupiter.

Yanouh is known for its 2nd century CE Roman temple, its Byzantine basilica and medieval chapel. In 750 AD, at the time of the fifth Maronite patriarch, John Maron II, then installed in Yanouh, the Roman temple was converted into a church consecrated to Saint George. Between 750 and 1277, twenty-three successors of Patriarch John Maroun resided there; under the Crusades, the number of Yanouh's inhabitants had risen to 3500, while the churches numbered more than thirty-five. Yanouh is also notable for its Hellenistic cult building containing the earliest Aramaic inscription found in Lebanon.

History
Surrounding the hill are a number of rectangular underground tombs with walls built of carefully hewn parallelepiped blocks. From the 12th to the 4th century BCE the site witnessed significant agricultural and domestic development as manifested by archaeological artifacts found on site. Remnants of sandstone building from the second half of the 2nd century BCE were uncovered along with an Aramaic inscription belonging to the same Hellenistic period. The inscription is notable for being the  earliest known Aramaic writing to be found on Lebanese soil; it mentions a “House of God” and was dated to around 110-109 BCE.

Yanouh became an important Roman site and saw the construction of a great temple dedicated to Diana, the Roman goddess of the hunt and daughter of Jupiter, with annexes and a smaller temple.
In the Byzantine Period, between the 4th and 7th centuries CE, the portico of the Great Temple was torn down. A Christian basilica with columns was built towards the end of the 5th century. During the first half of the 7th century a fire destroyed much of the buildings and reconstruction and rearrangement immediately followed; the basilica with columns was replaced by one with pillars.
The whole site was transformed into a monastery.

The Christians of Yanouh enjoyed quiet and prosperity even under Umayyad rule. Under the harsh Abbasid domination, between the 8th and 9th centuries, the site was totally abandoned, only to be repopulated under the Crusaders between the 10th and 13th centuries where inhabitants numbered 3500. During this time a chapel was built to the north of the Great Roman temple, which was itself turned into a church; the basilica was reshaped with access from the south side and thirty-five chapels were added to form a monastery complex. During this period, more land was cleared for agriculture and village dwellings appeared on the tell.
The whole site became a monastery named The Virgin of Ianosh (Anoch) and became with Patriarch Yuhanna in 938 the patriarchal seat of the Maronite Church until the mid-13th century. Between 1215 and 1246, two papal bulls mentioned the seat of the patriarchs as being the Church of the Virgin of Ianosh.

In 1276, under Mameluke persecution, the Maronite Patriarchate moved from Yanouh to Saint Ilige in the village of  Mayfouq. In the 15th century Yanouh and its surroundings were occupied by Shiites. In 1534 war waged between Kaisites and Yamanites in Joubbat El Mneitra and a great many inhabitants left. The monastery and village of Yanouh were deserted once again and the area described by Patriarch Estephan El Douaihy as a desert.

Geography
Yanouh is situated at Joubbat El Mneitra, 5 km east of Kartaba, on the right bank of the upper valley of the Adonis river. It is 40 km east of Byblos and 80 km from the capital city Beirut.

References

Populated places in Byblos District
Maronite Christian communities in Lebanon